Polvo is a populated place situated in Pima County, Arizona, United States, located near to the city of Tucson.

References

Populated places in Pima County, Arizona